This is a list of notable Arab-Israeli Muslims.

The list is ordered by category of human endeavor. Persons with significant contributions in two fields are listed in both of the pertinent categories, to facilitate easy lookup.

Religious figures
 Abdullah Nimar Darwish – founder of the Islamic Movement in Israel
 Raed Salah – leader of the northern branch of the Islamic Movement in Israel

Cultural figures

Film, TV, and stage 
 Hiam Abbass – actress

Writers 
 Khaled Abu Toameh – journalist

Models 
 Rana Raslan – fashion model who was Miss Israel in 1999. She was the first, and so far the only, Arab Israeli to win this title.

Military 
 Amira al Hayb –  first female Bedouin soldier in a combat position
 Amos Yarkoni – Bedouin-Israeli military officer

Politicians and government officials 

Ali Haidar Zahalka – former Mayor of Nazareth, former head of arab Misrad Hinouch in Israel, first delegate of Israel to the United Nations of Arab descent and of whom current israeli PM Benjamin Netanyahu was an observer for at the UN, one of the first creators of the Balad party of the Knesset, and one of the first creators of the Israeli scouts.
 Abdullah Nimar Darwish – the founder of the Islamic Movement in Israel.
 Hussein Faris – former politician who served as a member of the Knesset for Mapam and Meretz between 1988 and 1992.
 Masud Ghnaim – politician who currently serves as a member of the Knesset for the United Arab List.
 Hussniya Jabara – former politician who served as a member of the Knesset for Meretz between 1999 and 2003. She was the first Israeli Arab woman to become a Knesset member.
 Hamad Khalaily – former politician who served as a member of the Knesset for the Alignment from 1981 until 1984.
 Raleb Majadele – member of the Knesset for the Labor Party. Majadele became the country's first Muslim minister when appointed Minister without Portfolio on 28 January 2007.
 Nawaf Massalha – first Muslim Arab to hold a ministerial position in the Israeli government when he was appointed Deputy Minister of Health by Yitzhak Rabin in 1992.
 Taleb el-Sana – Israeli Bedouin politician and lawyer. He was the longest serving Arab Member of the Knesset until he lost his seat in 2013  Arab Member of the Knesset.
 Ibrahim Sarsur – politician and member of the Knesset for the United Arab List, of which he is the party leader.
 Wasil Taha – politician and member of the Knesset for the Israeli Arab party, Balad.
 Ali Yahya – diplomat. Yahya became the first Israeli ambassador of Arab descent in 1995 when he was appointed ambassador to Finland, a post in which he served until 1999. In 2006 Yahya was appointed Israeli ambassador to Greece.
 Abdel Rahman Zuabi – judge. Zuabi served on the Israeli Supreme Court for nine months in 1999, making him the first Israeli Arab on the country's highest court.
 Jamal Zahalka – Israeli Arab politician who serves as a member of the Knesset representing the Balad party. He is also a Balad party leader.
 Ahmad Tibi – politician and leader of the Arab party Ta'al (the Arab Movement for Renewal). He currently serves as Deputy Speaker of the Knesset.
 Abd el-Aziz el-Zoubi (1926–1974) – politician of Arabic descent, first non-Jewish member of the Knesset.
 Seif el-Din el-Zoubi (1913–1986) – politician, elected to the Knesset in 1949, resigned from politics in 1984.
 Haneen Zoabi – politician. In 2009 she became first Israeli Arab woman on an Arab party's list to be elected to the Knesset.

Academic figures 
 Ghazi Falah – Bedouin Israeli-Canadian geographer, who is currently a tenured professor at the University of Akron, Ohio, USA.

Sports 
 Mu'nas Dabbur (born 1992) - professional and Team Israel footballer
Hatem Abd Elhamed (born 1991) - professional and Team Israel footballer
Beram Kayal (born 1988) - professional and Team Israel footballer
 Dia Saba (born 1992) - professional and Team Israel footballer
 Abbas Suan (born 1976) - footballer from Sakhnin in the Galilee. As a footballer he was considered by many as one of the best Arab-Israeli players.

See also
 Israelis
 List of notable Israelis
 List of Israeli Arab Christians
 List of Arab citizens of Israel

References

Arab Muslims
 
Israeli Arab
 
Arab Muslims